Something So Right may refer to:

 Something So Right (TV series), an American television situation comedy
 "Something So Right" (song), 1973 song by Paul Simon
 Something So Right (album), 1976 album by Gwen McCrae
 Something So Right (TV film), 1982 television film starring Rick Schroeder, directed by Lou Antonio
 "Something So Right", 2008 song from Bratz Girlz Really Rock
 Something So Right, a 1986 novel by Emilie Richards
 Something So Right, a 2003 pornographic film starring April Flowers

See also 
 "Something So Wrong", song by Silent Running from Deep